Lau Wai Lim is a former international table tennis player from Hong Kong.

Table tennis career
In 1954 she won two gold medals in women's doubles and women's team events in the Asian Table Tennis Championships.

She also competed in the World Table Tennis Championships.

References

Hong Kong female table tennis players
Living people
Year of birth missing (living people)
Place of birth missing (living people)
Table tennis players at the 1958 Asian Games
Asian Games competitors for Hong Kong
20th-century Hong Kong women